The Austrian Students' Union by statutory body (ÖH) is the general students' representative body in Austria and serves as the students' government by federal law. The ÖH is member of European Students' Union.

Membership in the ÖH is compulsory for every university student in Austria, including PhD candidates.

Structure 
The statutes of the ÖH are regulated in a federal law, the "Hochschülerinnen und Hochschülerschaftsgesetz" (HSG).

The Students Union is structured into:
 Studienvertretung: board of representatives for each study (or group of related studies). It consists of typically 5 members. person-based direct election.
 Fakultätsstudienvertretung
 Universitätsvertretung: board of university students representatives. list based direct election.
 Bundesvertretung: National Board of the ÖH. It is elected (mainly) by the university boards.

Biannually, there are general elections. Turnout declined from about 70% in 1965 to 28.29% in the elections of 2007.

The HSG also includes regulations on the funding of the ÖH and its parts and the duties and rights of the students representatives.

History 
 1946: foundation of the ÖH
 1946: first general election
 1947: ÖH becomes a public statutory body
 1950: ÖH obtains the right to formally examine laws concerning education
 1952: first demonstration against student fees
 1959: the ÖH establishes the Austrian Student Aid Foundation (also: home4students)
 1962: one week strike
 1973, 1975: strengthening of the position of the ÖH by new laws
 1996, 2000, 2002, 2004 and especially in 2010 and 2011: demonstrations against various steps of loss of social benefits for students and legal restrictions of students representation.

See also 
European Students' Union (ESU), of which ÖH is a member.
EURODOC European Council of doctoral candidates and junior researchers. ÖH is a member.
Students' Union

References

External links
ÖH English Homepage
Official Website of home4students - Austrian Student Aid Foundation

Non-profit organisations based in Austria
National postgraduate representative bodies
Groups of students' unions
Education in Austria
Student organisations in Austria